Carlos Alberto Menditéguy (10 August 1914 – 27 April 1973) was a racing driver and polo player from Buenos Aires, Argentina.  He entered 11 Formula One World Championship Grands Prix, achieving one podium, and scoring a total of nine championship points.

In polo he reached the highest possible handicap of 10. He was an all round sportsman and became a scratch golfplayer in under two years as the result of a bet with some friends.

Menditeguy was buried in La Recoleta Cemetery in Buenos Aires.

Complete Formula One World Championship results
(key)

Non-Championship Formula One results
(key)

References

Argentine racing drivers
Argentine Formula One drivers
Gordini Formula One drivers
Scuderia Centro Sud Formula One drivers
Maserati Formula One drivers
Turismo Carretera drivers
Argentine polo players
Racing drivers from Buenos Aires
1914 births
1973 deaths
Burials at La Recoleta Cemetery
World Sportscar Championship drivers
Argentine people of Basque descent